Admiral Simpson may refer to:

Edward Simpson (governor) (1860–1930), U.S. Navy rear admiral
Edward Simpson (naval officer) (1824–1888), U.S. Navy rear admiral
Enrique Simpson (1835–1901), Chilean Navy counter admiral
George Simpson (Royal Navy officer) (1901–1972), British Royal Navy rear admiral
Robert Winthrop Simpson (1799–1877), British-born Chilean Navy rear admiral
Rodger W. Simpson (1898–1964), U.S. Navy rear admiral

See also
Beau "Cyclone" Simpson, fictional vice admiral in the 2022 film, Top Gun: Maverick
John Simpson, fictional admiral in the 1632 novel series
Robert Simpson-Anderson (born 1942), South African Navy vice admiral